Tomaž Barada is a former Slovenian martial artist in kickboxing and taekwon-do (7th Dan). He gained several titles during his career.

He became 6x ITF European Champion, 3x ITF World Champion and 3x King of Taekwon-Do Tokyo.

He also became 5x W.A.K.O. European and 5x WAKO World Champion. Currently retired, he is holding the WAKO record of 84 fights without a loss. He retired in 2004 after defending his WAKO pro title for the final time.

He is the current Vice president of the Slovenian Olympic Committee.

References

Slovenian male kickboxers
Slovenian male taekwondo practitioners
Year of birth missing (living people)
Living people
Slovenian sports executives and administrators